Pisces class submersibles are three person research deep-submergence vehicles designed and built by Hyco International Hydrodynamics of North Vancouver in British Columbia with a maximum operating depth of 2,000 m (6,560 ft). The vehicles have multiple view ports, sample collecting, environmental sensing, and instrument placement capabilities. The pressure hull has a  inside diameter and is made of HY-100 steel with 3 forward-looking acrylic windows,  in diameter. Designed by Allan Trice, the Pisces series of submersibles are representative of early crewed submersibles built in the late 1960s and were proven workhorses in offshore exploration and oceanographic research. Pisces II was the first production model of the design and was completed in 1968, with 9 more Pisces subs built before the manufacturer folded in the late 1970s.

1973 Pisces III rescue

Pisces III was being used to bury cable and repeaters of the CANTAT-2 transatlantic telephone cable on the sea bottom off Ireland in 1973 when a buoyancy tank was inadvertently flooded. Initial rescue efforts by Pisces III sister submersibles were unsuccessful. Through an international effort of the United States, Canada, and Great Britain, the U.S. Navy Cable-controlled Undersea Recovery Vehicle (CURV-III) was deployed within 24 hours 6,000 miles from its home base. Deployment of CURV-III from CCGS John Cabot was hampered by heavy sea conditions. Rapid repairs were made when CURV-III’s  gyroscope failed and electronics shorted-out after sea water came aboard the Cabot. Assisted by the submersibles Pisces II and Pisces V, CURV-III was able to attach lines to the Pisces III hatch. The lines were cut, CURV-III was abandoned, and Pisces III was floated to  where scuba divers were able to attach lines that were used to lift Pisces III the rest of the way to the surface. CURV-III performed the deepest underwater rescue in history when Pisces III’s two-man crew was rescued after 76 hours with just 12 minutes of air remaining.

Pisces IV and V
Pisces IV and Pisces V are currently operated for research by the National Oceanic and Atmospheric Administration, based in Hawaii. Its mother ship, the R/V Kaimikai-o-Kanaloa, launches Pisces V and its sister vessel Pisces IV from an A-frame hoist on its aft deck.

Pisces IV was built for the Soviet Union in 1971, but due to national security concerns from the United States that sensitive technology might be transferred to the Soviets, Canadian Government refused to issue the export permit and instead purchased it for its Department of Fisheries and Oceans.  Both Pisces IV and V are currently operated by the Hawaii Underwater Research Laboratory, part of the US National Undersea Research Program. The second Pisces is kept on board in a ready state in case of an emergency.

Pisces VI 
Pisces VI was purchased out of storage from International Underwater Contractors in 2015.  Currently Pisces VI is undergoing a complete refit in Salina, Kansas.  Pisces VI is being reengineered to provide a versatile deep water platform to meet the needs of the underwater research community.

Pisces VII and XI
Pisces VII and Pisces XI were built in 1975 and used by the Shirshov Institute of Oceanology of the Academy of Sciences of the USSR for about ten years, until being replaced by the MIR submersibles.

Akademik Kurchatov, Dmitri Mendeleyev, and Akademik Mstislav Keldysh served as their support ships.

Production

Current status of vehicles

 Pisces II is currently on display at Deep Marine, a maritime museum highlighting the deep-sea technology legacy of Hyco at Deep Marine, located at the old Versatile Pacific Shipyards site on the waterfront at Esplanade and Lonsdale, in North Vancouver, British Columbia, Canada.
 Pisces III is on display at Weymouth Sea Life Centre, Dorset, United Kingdom.
 Both Pisces IV and V have undergone recent upgrades and are operated by the Hawai‘i Undersea Research Laboratory (HURL), NOAA’s Undersea Research Center at the University of Hawaii School of Ocean & Earth Science & Technology.
 Pisces VI underwent refit in Salina, Kansas, United States, and is now based in the Canary Islands.
 Of the two Russian-owned submersibles, Pisces VII and XI, VII is on display at the Museum of the World Ocean in Kaliningrad, next to the research vessel Vityaz. XI is on display at the Baikal Museum in Listvyanka.

References

Sources
 
 
 
 
 

Submarine classes
Submarines of Canada
 
1970 ships
Ships built in British Columbia